WLMH (89.1 FM) was a radio station broadcasting a Variety format. Formerly licensed to Morrow, Ohio, United States, the station was owned by Little Miami Schools.

WLMH went off-the-air on August 25, 2010. On August 1, 2012, the Federal Communications Commission (FCC) cancelled WLMH's license due to the station being silent for longer than 12 months. The FCC also deleted the WLMH call sign from its database.

External links
 

LMH
Radio stations disestablished in 2012
Defunct radio stations in the United States
High school radio stations in the United States
2012 disestablishments in Ohio
LMH